Westcliff is a suburb of Southend-on-Sea, a city in Essex, England.

Westcliff or West Cliff may also refer to:

Places
 West Cliff, Bournemouth, a suburb of Bournemouth, a town in Dorset, England
 West Cliff, Preston, a cricket ground in Preston, a city in Lancashire, England
 Westcliff, Dumbarton, Scotland, a public housing estate 
 Westcliff, Gauteng, a suburb of Johannesburg, South Africa

Other uses
 Westcliff (card game), a patience or solitaire
 Westcliff railway station
 Westcliff RFC, a rugby club

See also
 Westcliffe (disambiguation)